The Saek (Thai: แสก) or Tai Saek are an ethnic group of Laos and Thailand.  The Saek are a part of the larger Tai ethnicity.

Geographic distribution
The center of the Saek population is the Mekong River in central Laos. A smaller Saek community makes its home in the Isan region of northeast Thailand, near the border with Laos.

Language
The language of the Saek people is also called Saek, and it is part of the northern Tai branch of the Tai–Kadai language family. Many Saek have also adopted Lao.

Culture
Most Saek cultural practices were either absorbed from the surrounding Lao and Thai cultures, or were practices common to the greater Tai ethnicity. However, the Saek are known for their round dances.

Religion
Most of the Saek in Laos adhere to their traditional beliefs, which include ancestor worship, with a small number adhering to Theravada Buddhism. Offerings are often made to spirits to prevent illness. Spirits often represent the forces of nature, and each Saek village typically has a guardian spirit.

References 

Tai peoples
Ethnic groups in Southeast Asia
Ethnic groups in Thailand
Ethnic groups in Laos